This article lists the British consuls in Tonga from 1901 to 1970. They were responsible for representing British interests in the Kingdom of Tonga while the country was a British protectorate (from 18 May 1900 until 4 June 1970).

For British representatives in Tonga from 1973 until 2006 and since 2019, see: List of High Commissioners of the United Kingdom to Tonga.

For British representatives in Tonga from 2006 until 2019, see: List of High Commissioners of the United Kingdom to Fiji.

List

(Dates in italics indicate de facto continuation of office)

See also

History of Tonga
Foreign relations of Tonga

External links

British consuls in Tonga
History of Tonga
Tonga
Tonga
Tonga and the Commonwealth of Nations
United Kingdom and the Commonwealth of Nations
Tonga diplomacy-related lists